Nolan Siegel (born November 8, 2004) is an American racing driver. He currently competes in the Indy NXT with HMD Motorsports w/ Dale Coyne Racing. Siegel previously competed in the U.S. F2000 National Championship with DEForce Racing.

Career

Formula 4 United States Championship 
Siegel would join the final round of the 2019 Formula 4 United States Championship held at Circuit of the Americas driving for Jay Howard Driver Development. He finished in the top-10 in both races.

Siegel would return to the championship for the first two rounds of the 2020 season once again driving for Jay Howard Driver Development. He would have a best finish of sixth in his final race.

U.S. F2000 National Championship 
On February 13, 2019, it was announced that Siegel would compete full-time in the 2019 U.S. F2000 National Championship for Newman Wachs Racing. He would finish 15th in the championship.

Siegel returned to the championship in 2020 and switched teams to drive for Jay Howard Driver Development. He took two podiums at Mid-Ohio and finished 13th in the standings.

In January of 2021, it was announced that Siegel would return for a third season in 2021 driving for DEForce Racing. He would get his first win in the third race held at New Jersey Motorsports Park. He would finish the season 8th in the standings.

Indy Pro 2000 
During 2021, Siegel would make his Indy Pro 2000 debut at Gateway Motorsports Park driving for DEForce Racing. He would impress by finishing 5th.

DEForce Racing announced that Siegel would move up to the series full-time in 2022. At the first round held at St. Petersburg, he would take his maiden win by beating competitor Louis Foster on a late restart. Siegel would dominate the second race held at Barber Motorsports Park starting from pole and leading the race from start to finish. Ultimately, he would end up finishing 4th in the championship due to inconsistency during the middle and latter stages of the season.

Indy NXT 
On September 8, 2022, it was announced that Siegel would make his Indy Lights debut at final round held at Laguna Seca driving for HMD Motorsports with Dale Coyne Racing.

Siegel announced in October of 2022 that he would make the jump up to Indy NXT full-time for 2023 once again with HMD Motorsports with Dale Coyne Racing.

Racing record

Career summary 

* Season still in progress.

Complete WeatherTech SportsCar Championship results
(key) (Races in bold indicate pole position; results in italics indicate fastest lap)

American open-wheel racing results

U.S. F2000 National Championship 
(key) (Races in bold indicate pole position) (Races in italics indicate fastest lap) (Races with * indicate most race laps led)

Indy Pro 2000 Championship 
(key) (Races in bold indicate pole position) (Races in italics indicate fastest lap) (Races with * indicate most race laps led)

Indy NXT
(key) (Races in bold indicate pole position) (Races in italics indicate fastest lap) (Races with L indicate a race lap led) (Races with * indicate most race laps led)

References 

2004 births
Living people
Racing drivers from California
U.S. F2000 National Championship drivers

Indy Pro 2000 Championship drivers
WeatherTech SportsCar Championship drivers
Newman Wachs Racing drivers
Indy Lights drivers
Dale Coyne Racing drivers
Michelin Pilot Challenge drivers
Asian Le Mans Series drivers
United States F4 Championship drivers
NACAM F4 Championship drivers
HMD Motorsports drivers